Events in the year 2023 in South Africa.

Incumbents
 President: Cyril Ramaphosa (ANC) 
 Deputy President: David Mabuza (ANC)
 Chief Justice: Raymond Zondo
 Deputy Chief Justice: Mandisa Maya
 President of the Supreme Court of Appeal: Xola Petse (acting)
 Deputy President of the Supreme Court of Appeal: Nambitha Dambuza (acting)
 Chairperson of the Electoral Court of South Africa: Boissie Henry Mbha
 Speaker of the National Assembly: Nosiviwe Mapisa-Nqakula (ANC)
 Deputy Speaker of the National Assembly: Lechesa Tsenoli (ANC)
 Leader of the Opposition in the National Assembly: John Steenhuisen (DA)
 Leader of Government Business: David Mabuza (ANC)
 Government Chief Whip (of the National Assembly): Pemmy Majodina (ANC)
 Opposition Chief Whip (of the National Assembly): Siviwe Gwarube (DA)
 Chairperson of the National Council of Provinces: Amos Masondo (ANC)
 Deputy Chairperson of the National Council of Provinces: Sylvia Lucas (ANC)
 Leader of the Opposition of the National Council of Provinces: Cathlene Labuschagne (DA)
 Chief Whip of the National Council of Provinces: Seiso Mohai (ANC)

Cabinet 
The Cabinet, together with the President and the Deputy President, forms the Executive.

National Assembly and National Council of Provinces

Provincial Premiers 

 Eastern Cape Province: Oscar Mabuyane (ANC) 
 Free State Province: Sisi Ntombela (ANC) 
 Gauteng Province: Panyaza Lesufi (ANC) 
 KwaZulu-Natal Province: Nomusa Dube-Ncube (ANC) 
 Limpopo Province: Stanley Mathabatha (ANC) 
 Mpumalanga Province: Refilwe Mtsweni-Tsipane (ANC) 
 North West Province: Bushy Maape (ANC) 
 Northern Cape Province: Zamani Saul (ANC) 
 Western Cape Province: Alan Winde (DA)

Events

 12 January – A truck crashes into several minibus taxis at an intersection in Roodepoort, Gauteng, killing five people and injuring nine others.
 15 January – A light aircraft crashes in Nasrec, Johannesburg, South Africa, killing all three people on board.
 27 January – South Africa agrees to send 12 cheetahs to India a year for the next 8 to 10 years to help establish a "viable and secure cheetah population" in the wild. The Asiatic cheetah became extinct in India in the 1940s due to hunting and habitat destruction.
 29 January – Eight people are killed and three others are injured in a mass shooting at a birthday party in Gqeberha, Eastern Cape.
 5 February – South Africa reports imported cases of cholera in two sisters who travelled to Malawi.
 14 February – Twenty people are killed and 68 others injured during a head-on collision between a tour bus and an armoured cash-in-transit van in Makhado, Limpopo.

Holidays

South Africa has 12 public holidays; if a holiday falls on a Sunday, it is celebrated the following Monday.

1 January – New Year's Day
21 March – Human Rights Day
27 April – Freedom Day (National day)
1 May - National Worker's Day
16 June – Youth Day
9 August – National Women's Day
24 September – Heritage Day
16 December - Reconciliation Day
25 December - Christmas Day
26 December - Day of Goodwill

Deaths 
 8 January: Adriaan Vlok, 85, politician, minister of correctional services (1991–1994).
 6 February: John Moeti, 55, South African footballer.

 10 February: AKA, 35, South African rapper, drive-by shooting.

 11 March: Costa Titch, 28, South African rapper.

See also

Country overviews

 History of South Africa
 History of modern South Africa
 Outline of South Africa
 Government of South Africa
 Politics of South Africa
 National Council of Provinces (NCOP)
 National Assembly of South Africa
 Timeline of South Africa history

Related timelines for current period

 2020s
 2020s in political history
 COVID-19 pandemic in Africa
 COVID-19 pandemic in South Africa
 COVID-19 vaccination in South Africa

References

External links

 
South Africa
South Africa
2020s in South Africa
Years of the 21st century in South Africa